Riessen is a German surname. Notable people with the surname include:

Irmgard Riessen (born 1944), German actress
Marty Riessen (born 1941), American tennis player

See also
Van Riessen

German-language surnames